Beyce can refer to the following villages in Turkey:

 Beyce, Bilecik
 Beyce, Dursunbey